The Gold Coast Parklands was a complex serving the greyhound racing and harness racing industries on the Gold Coast, Queensland, Australia. It opened on 7 December 1988 on the corner of Smith Street and Parklands Drive, Southport on the Gold Coast, Queensland at a cost of nine million dollars.

History
Plans to build the complex began in 1983 when the Racing Minister for Queensland, Mr Russell Hinze, visited the Gold Coast.  He was reportedly disappointed by trotting and grey hound racing facilities a Owen Park, Southport. The decision was made to provide improved facilities at another location and State Government land and was selected opposite Griffith University.
 
The complex was managed by the Parklands Trust and was the home for a number of organisations including the Gold Coast Show Society, Gold Coast Greyhound Racing the Parklands Indoor Sports Centre and the Gold Coast Harness Racing Club.
Between 1993 and 2013 it was also the venue for the annual Big Day Out concert.
In 2007, The State Government announced plans to build a new hospital adjacent to the complex.
This resulted in the departure of Gold Coast Greyhound Racing from Parklands in 2009.
On 1 February 2013 the remaining part of the site was formally designated as the athletes' village for the 2018 Commonwealth Games and was declared a Priority Development Area (PDA) by the Government of Queensland.
In August 2013 a call for stories, memories and photographs from the community to commemorate the history of Parklands was launched. These stories and ephemera relating to the complex were donated to the City of Gold Coast Local Studies Library.

Demolition of the buildings on the site commenced in late 2013 and in December 2013 Grocon won the contract to build the village. Grocon worked with consulting companies Cardno and Lat27 to create the new development.

See also

 Sports on the Gold Coast, Queensland

References

Bibliography

External links
 Harness Racing Gold Coast
 Gold Coast Show
 Gold Coast 2018 Commonwealth Games
 Gold Coast Big Day Out
 Commonwealth Games Village
 Grocon

Defunct sports venues in Australia
Demolished buildings and structures in Queensland
Defunct greyhound racing venues in Australia
Harness racing in Australia
Harness racing venues in Australia
Sports venues completed in 1988
Sports venues demolished in 2013
Sports venues on the Gold Coast, Queensland
1988 establishments in Australia
Demolished sports venues